NBA Ballers: Rebound is a PlayStation Portable video game from Midway Games, part of the NBA Ballers series. In this game players play one on one matches against other ballers to gain points which they can use to buy cars, bling, clothes etc. The games are best of three rounds and each round is to eleven points.

Single-player

Rags To Riches
Rags To Riches is a single player mode where players create a baller and try to play their way up through the ranks from the fellow street ballers to the NBA greats. This is the main mode of the game. The Rags To Riches tournaments consist of:

Inside Stuff
Inside Stuff is a place where players can acquire NBA stars, cars, cribs, special in game movies, and codes or phrase-ology, with points that players get from any single player mode in the game. All the items they "buy" can be accessed every time they load their profile. It is somewhat of a trophy case for extreme NBA Baller: Rebound players.

Reception

The game received "average" reviews according to the review aggregation website Metacritic.

References

External links

https://web.archive.org/web/20070828211507/http://www.nbaballers.com/rebound.php

2006 video games
Midway video games
National Basketball Association video games
PlayStation Portable games
PlayStation Portable-only games
Video games developed in Canada